Akio Morimoto (森本晃生 - Morimoto Akio; born 24 September 1960) is a Japanese professional racing driver.

Racing record

Japanese Top Formula Championship results 
(key) (Races in bold indicate pole position) (Races in italics indicate fastest lap)

Complete 24 Hours of Le Mans results

References 

1960 births
Living people
Japanese racing drivers
24 Hours of Spa drivers

Nismo drivers
Team LeMans drivers
24 Hours of Le Mans drivers
World Sportscar Championship drivers
Japanese Sportscar Championship drivers